West St. Mary's Manor is a historic house on West St. Mary's Manor Road in rural St. Mary's County, Maryland.  Built in the 1780s according to dendrochronology and with a four-room center-hall plan, and is located on the first recorded English land grant in what is now Maryland. It was designated a National Historic Landmark in 1970.

Description
West St. Mary's Manor is located across the St. Mary's River from St. Mary's City, Maryland, the first capital of the Province of Maryland.  It is a -story brick and frame construction.  The gable end walls of the  house are brick with double chimneys, while the front and rear walls are clapboard. A brick "chimney pent" is situated between the projecting chimneys at both ends. The front elevation, facing south, is five bays wide, while the north elevation is three bays.

The interior comprises four rooms about a center hall running through the house. The main rooms are on the south side, with smaller rooms on the north. All of the first floor rooms have wainscoting and fireplaces. The chimney pents serve as closets for the main rooms. The center hall is divided by an arch, with a stair to the rear.

History
West St. Mary's Manor originally included  granted to Captain Henry Fleet in 1634, the earliest grant recorded in Maryland. The house was believed to have been built between 1700 and 1730, possibly by the family of Daniel Bell who was one of 15 leaseholders for the larger property. However, tree ring analysis or dendrochronology established a later date in the 1780s.  The house's architecture is typical of the transition from smaller earlier colonial houses, typically just two rooms, to larger homes with a center passage.

The house has been renovated and expanded with historically sympathetic additions.

See also
List of National Historic Landmarks in Maryland
National Register of Historic Places listings in St. Mary's County, Maryland

References

External links
, including photo in 2000, at Maryland Historical Trust

Houses completed in 1730
Houses on the National Register of Historic Places in Maryland
Houses in St. Mary's County, Maryland
Historic American Buildings Survey in Maryland
National Register of Historic Places in St. Mary's County, Maryland
National Historic Landmarks in Maryland